Early Slavs settled in the eastern and southern parts of the former Roman province of Pannonia. The term Lower Pannonia was used to designate those areas of the Pannonian plain that lie to the east and south of the river Rába, with the division into Upper and Lower inherited from the Roman terminology.

From the middle of the 6th to the end of the 8th century, the region was under the domination of the Avars, while the Slavic inhabitants lived under Avar rule. By the beginning of the 9th century, that state was destroyed and replaced by the supreme rule of the Frankish Empire, which lasted until the Magyar conquest (c. 900). 

During the Frankish period, the region of Lower Pannonia was governed by local Slavic rulers, who were under the suzerainty of Frankish kings. Within the Frankish administrative system, the March of Pannonia was created, with direct Frankish rule exercised in Upper Pannonia through Frankish counts, while Lower Pannonia was governed as a principality by local Slavic princes, under the supreme Frankish rule. During the 9th century, Frankish domination in Lower Pannonia was also contested by the Bulgarian Empire and Great Moravia.

By the 10th century, the Hungarian conquest of the Carpathian Basin effectively split the Slavic communities in the region in two, leading to the formation of the West Slavs and the South Slavs.

Background

Roman rule in Pannonian regions collapsed during the 5th century, and was replaced by subsequent domination of Huns, Goths and Langobards. During the reign of Byzantine Emperor Justin II (565–578), and following the Lombard-Gepid War in 567, Pannonia was invaded by Avars who subsequently conquered almost entire Pannonian Plain (568). Although it is possible that some small Proto-Slavic groups could have arrived in the "middle of the 5th century and the time of Hunnish domination", during the 6th and 7th centuries, Pannonian regions were certainly inhabited by Slavs, who were under the Avarian rule.

Principality

During the Frankish war against Avars, the Royal Frankish Annals made mention of a Wonomyrus Sclavus (Vojnomir the Slav or Zvonomir the Slav) active in 795. Eric, Duke of Friuli, sent Vojnomir with his army into Pannonia, between the Danube and Tisza, where they pillaged the Avars' dominions. The next year the Avars were defeated and Frankish power was extended further east, to the central Danube. In the mid-9th century, Lower Pannonia was already inhabited by a Slavic majority (besides "Pannonian Slavs" including Dulebes and possibly some Croats), and Christian Avars were also found in Lower Pannonia in 873.

After the destruction of the Avarian state, Pannonian Slavs came under the Frankish rule. Initially, local Slavic princes were under Frankish suzerainty, within the March of Pannonia, and some of them are known from Frankish primary sources. Prince Ljudevit was mentioned in the Royal Frankish Annals as Duke of Lower Pannonia, having led an uprising against the Franks (811–822). Their motives aren't known but it's presumed to have been led by the desire for greater autonomy. His stronghold was in Sisak, former metropolis of ancient Roman province Pannonia Savia. However, the exact boundaries of his principality are uncertain as the term of Lower Pannonian could have implied both the lands between the river Drava and Sava as well as North of them and East of them in the former Roman province Pannonia Secunda (today's Syrmia). Possibly his rule expanded further to the East because in the historical sources is said to have been joined by the tribe of Timočani who lived around Timok Valley (in today's Eastern Serbia). The size of the principality had to be proportional to the resources needed to rebel against the military forces of Borna of Dalmatia and Franks.

After Ljudevit's failed uprising and death, in 827 the Bulgars under Great Khan Omurtag invaded and conquered Lower Pannonia and parts of Frankish territories to the north. They also installed their own governors. The Bulgarian-Frankish conflict was probably spurred over the control of the tribes of Timočani and Abodrites. German King Louis in 828 made a counterattack and eventually March of Friuli was divided into four counties. One of them probably was early Duchy of Croatia (which also expanded upon the territory of Sisak) while Pannonia again became part of the Pannonian March, both of which vassals to East Francia. The next year Bulgars made another attack but without further success, although the territory of Pannonia most probably lost its Eastern part to the First Bulgarian Empire.

After that, in 838 a local Slavic prince Ratimir emerged as the new ruler in Lower Pannonian regions, around rivers Drava and Sava. He probably ruled the Eastern areas of Pannonia and was a Bulgar's governor. To him fled Pribina, former prince of the Principality of Nitra expelled by Mojmir I of Moravia. In the same year Frankish count Radbod of the East March deposed Ratimir and strengthened Frankish rule in Lower Pannonia. Ratimir fled the land, and the Franks instated Slavic prince Pribina as the new ruler of Lower Pannonia. Pribina (d. 861) was succeeded by his son, prince Kocel. During the rule of Pribina and Kocel, capital of the Principality of Lower Pannonia was Mosapurc (Mosapurc regia civitate), also known in Old-Slavonic as Blatnograd (modern Zalavár near Lake Balaton). The polity was a vassal principality of the Frankish Empire, or according to others, a frontier county of the Eastern Frankish Kingdom. It was initially led by a dux (Pribina) and later by a comes (Kocel) who was titled as "Count of the Slavs". Their authority stretched towards the northwest up to the Rába river and Ptuj, and to the southeast up to the Baranya region and the Danube river. During the time of Kocel in Lower Pannonia was active Byzantine missionary Methodius, and to the same period is dated Pope John VIII's letter to uncertain dux Mutimir, commonly considered to be Mutimir of Serbia, about the formation of the Diocese of Pannonia with the seat in Sirmium and which archbishop at Kocel's request was Methodius (see also Archbishopric of Moravia).

The course of events by the end of the 9th century is unclear. Although still under the Frankish influence, a new threat was coming from Svatopluk I of Moravia. Braslav was the last dux of Lower Pannonia between at least 884 and 896. His territory initially spanned between the Drava and Sava, which he held under the overlordship of Arnulf of Carinthia. He participated in the Frankish–Moravian War, and in 895 or 896 Arnulf handed over Pannonia to him in order to secure the Frankish frontier against a new threat - the Hungarians who conquered Great Moravia. However, the Hungarians subsequently overran all of Pannonian Basin and continued into Kingdom of Italy.

Aftermath
Following the rise of the Principality of Hungary in the mid 890s, and especially after Battle of Pressburg (907), no further Slavic rulers were recorded in the regions of Lower Pannonia. The Hungarian conquest separated the West Slavs from the South Slavs which influenced the formation of new Slavic identities. Part of Moravian Slavs also fled to the Duchy of Croatia. It seems that the new border between Croatia and Hungary was North of the town of Sisak based on a recent archaeological finding of a "knez from Bojna" near Glina and that the diocese with the seat in Sisak was offered at the council of Split (928) to bishop Gregory of Nin, which could have only been possible if it was within the borders of the Kingdom of Croatia. In the mid 920s, Tomislav of Croatia expanded his rule to some Lower Pannonian territories, between Sava and Drava, adding them to the Croatian kingdom. Until the end of the 11th century its Western border was also contested by the Holy Roman Empire, and in the same time, Southeastern Pannonian regions (Syrmia) were contested between Hungarians and Bulgarians throughout the 10th century. There has remained a general uncertainty and dispute over the borders between the Croatian and Hungarian states in the 10th and 11th century, with Croatian historian Ferdo Šišić and his followers assuming Tomislav of Croatia had ruled most of the area inhabited by Croats, including southern Pannonian regions (Slavonia), while the Hungarian historians Gyula Kristó, Bálint Hóman and János Karácsonyi thought the area between Drava and Sava rivers belonged neither to Croatia nor to Hungary at the time, an opinion that Nada Klaić said she would not preclude, because the generic name "Slavonia" (lit. the land of the Slavs) may have implied so. However it was probably more connected and under influence of Croatia. With the continued growth of population, the formation of the church and administrative organization, including the founding of the diocese of Zagreb (1094), even after Croatia entered a personal union with the Kingdom of Hungary it retained partial autonomy having governor titled as Ban of Slavonia.

Archaeology
The population's inhumation practices and rituals differed and mixed upon various cultural and ethnic influences. Even after the Frankish defeat of Avars and the process of Christianization some pagan practices and rituals did not change, like a cemetery in rows, feasting at the funeral or steppe burial rite with horse and equipment. Many new settlements were founded around ancient towns and one of them, Sisak, was even the seat of a Christian diocese. The native and mainly sedentary Slavic population assimilated Avars and was part of Avaro-Slavic Middle Podunavlje culture. Sedov considered that those Slavs were a mixture of Sclaveni of Prague-Korchak culture and mostly Antes of Penkovka and Ipotesti–Candesti culture with some Martinovka culture artifacts. According to M. Guštin and L. Bekić, radiocarbon dating confirmed dating to late 6th and early 7th century, but although the Pannonian and near Alpine Slavs material culture had features of both Korchak and Penkovka-type, predominates Korchak-type with paralles in Northern Slovenia, Austria and Hungary (among others from Western Slovakia and Czechia's region of Moravia up to Ukraine, Poland, East Germany and Romania), indicating mostly migration to Northern Croatia through the Moravian Gate between Eastern Austria and Western Hungary, but not excluding another migration wave from Lower and Middle Danube, upstream of the river Sava and Drava. Later they also assimilated Hungarians whose elite burials are distinguished by Eastern artifacts, but eventually through the administrative system were linguistically assimilated by the Hungarians themselves. In the 10th century due to interaction with the Hungarians was formed so-called Bijelo Brdo culture located in the area of Podunavlje. 

According to the craniometrical measurements and archaeological findings early Croats probably did not initially settle in Lower Pannonia and their relationship with Pannonian Slavs was more political rather than ethnic. Others argue that the "Bijelo Brdo and Vukovar cemeteries can hardly be regarded evidence of a pre-Croatian Slavic population in northern Croatia" and they rather "represent a population fleeing the Magyars" during the 10th century". Those Slavs who migrated to the territory of present-day Lower and Upper Austria, first already during the time of Langobards as carriers of Prague-Korchak culture while majority from 7th and 8th century belonged to Avaro-Slavic culture, were assimilated by the Bavarians until the end of the 12th century.

In Croatian historiography
Contemporary Latin sources referred to the region as Pannonia inferior (Lower Pannonia), and its inhabitants in general terms of Slavs and Pannonians. Nevertheless a whole century under the foreign Frankish rule there did not emerge a single gens with a specific identity for the population. In the 19th and 20th century Croatian historiography, the focus was usually placed on the polity between the rivers Drava and Sava. They referred to the polity as Pannonian Croatia, to describe this entity in a manner that emphasized its Croatian nature, mainly based on De Administrando Imperio (DAI) chapter 30. While DAI claims that a part of the Dalmatian Croats had moved into Pannonia in the 7th century and ruled over it, some modern analysis of sources indicate this was unlikely. Nevertheless, according to Croatian historian Hrvoje Gračanin, the traditions and language of the Slavs of southern Pannonia did not differ from those in Dalmatia, so during the periods when Frankish sources did not record a specific ruler of Lower Pannonia, it is possible that the Croatian dukes of Dalmatia, who were also Frankish vassals at the time, extended control over the region. The Croat name was not used in contemporary sources, until the late 9th century, rendering the name anachronistic before then, but many toponyms deriving from the Croatian ethnonym are very old and at least from the period between 11th and 12th century. While the term "Croat" was not used in sources about Pannonia, the rulers of the Trpimirović dynasty after Trpimir called themselves the rulers of the Croats and of the Slavs. Since "Pannonian Croatia" politically and ethnically never existed, being a historiographical and not historical term, it is abandoned in modern Croatian historiography which uses instead the term "Donja Panonija" (Lower Pannonia).

Rulers

The continuity of Slavic rulers in Lower Pannonia is unclear, and they were not consistently part of a ruling dynasty, unlike those in the north (House of Mojmir) and the south (House of Trpimir).

See also
 Outline of Slavic history and culture

Annotations

References

Sources

Further reading
 
 
 
 
 
 
 
 

South Slavic tribes
Slavic pagans
Slavic warriors
Pannonia
Former countries in the Balkans
States and territories established in the 8th century
States and territories disestablished in the 10th century
Croatian principalities
7th century in Croatia
8th century in Croatia
9th century in Croatia
9th century in East Francia
9th century in Hungary
9th century in Serbia
10th century in Croatia
Medieval Croatia
Medieval history of Vojvodina
History of Syrmia
Medieval Slovenia
Medieval Bosnia and Herzegovina
Great Moravia
History of Baranya (region)
History of Somogy